Üzümçülük is a village in the municipality of Nərimanabad, in the Lankaran Rayon of Azerbaijan.

References

Populated places in Lankaran District